A MRS Degree or Mrs. Degree is a slang term for when a young woman attends college or university with the intention of finding a potential spouse, rather than to pursue academic achievement for a future career. The term derives from "Mrs.", a common honorific for married women. The term has negative connotations.

The term MRS Degree was most commonly used during the mid 20th century in North America, when higher education became more accessible, yet the possibilities for women were still very limited. College was seen as not a way of further refining and educating women, but as a way of maneuvering girls close to bright young men with big futures.

References

Academic degrees
Criticism of academia
Dysphemisms
Feminism and history
Pejorative terms for women
History of women in the United States
20th century in women's history
Women's education in the United States